Mountain Park is an unincorporated, census-designated place in Gwinnett County, Georgia, United States. The population was 11,554 at the 2010 census.  The older name for the area is Trickum, which is reflected in Five Forks-Trickum Road which bisects the community.  The older community was centered on Five Forks and Rockbridge Roads.

Geography

Demographics

2020 census

As of the 2020 United States census, there were 13,089 people, 4,516 households, and 3,559 families residing in the CDP.

2000 census
As of the census of 2000, there were 11,753 people, 4,282 households, and 3,378 families residing in the CDP. The racial makeup of the CDP was 82.15% White, 5.96% African American, 0.23% Native American, 9.10% Asian, 0.03% Pacific Islander, 1.00% from other races, and 1.55% from two or more races. Hispanic or Latino of any race were 2.66% of the population.

There were 4,282 households, out of which 35.4% had children under the age of 18 living with them, 67.0% were married couples living together, 8.8% had a female householder with no husband present, and 21.1% were non-families. 17.7% of all households were made up of individuals, and 6.7% had someone living alone who was 65 years of age or older.  The average household size was 2.73 and the average family size was 3.10.

In the CDP, the population was spread out, with 24.5% under the age of 18, 6.7% from 18 to 24, 25.7% from 25 to 44, 31.2% from 45 to 64, and 11.8% who were 65 years of age or older.  The median age was 41 years. For every 100 females, there were 93.9 males.  For every 100 females age 18 and over, there were 92.2 males.

The median income for a household in the CDP was $62,892, and the median income for a family was $70,768. Males had a median income of $47,436 versus $31,608 for females. The per capita income for the CDP was $28,454.  About 2.2% of families and 3.4% of the population were below the poverty line, including 3.5% of those under age 18 and 4.9% of those age 65 or over.

Education
The county operates Gwinnett County Public Schools.

Gwinnett County Public Library operates the Mountain Park Branch.

References

External links

Corinth Hills Homeowners Association

Census-designated places in Gwinnett County, Georgia